Henry Victor Bradford (March 5, 1915 – June 10, 1994) was an outfielder in Major League Baseball. As an amateur athlete, Bradford was a blocking back for the University of Alabama football team, the Crimson Tide, and played in the 1938 Rose Bowl Game. A multi-sport athlete, he was signed by the New York Giants in 1943. After his poor eyesight was fixed by surgery, his military draft status changed from 3-A to 1-A  
and he enlisted in the Navy's Aviation Cadet Training Program located on the University of North Carolina at Chapel Hill campus.

References

External links

1915 births
1994 deaths
American football quarterbacks
Major League Baseball outfielders
Alabama Crimson Tide baseball players
Alabama Crimson Tide football players
Alabama Crimson Tide men's basketball players
Baylor Bears baseball coaches
Baylor Bears football coaches
Kansas Jayhawks baseball coaches
Kansas Jayhawks football coaches
Kentucky Wildcats football coaches
Navy Midshipmen football coaches
New York Giants (NL) players
United States Navy personnel of World War II
United States Navy officers
People from Brownsville, Tennessee
Baseball players from Tennessee
American men's basketball players